Mangesh Kadam is a Marathi movie and play director from Maharashtra, India.

Plays as director
 Jadoo Teri Nazar (2007)
 Soor Rahu De 
 Govind ghya, koni Gopal Ghya - ‘गोविंद घ्या, कुणी गोपाळ घ्या’
 Moruchi Mavshi - 'मोरुची मावशी Play as actor

 Hich tar premachi gammat ahe - '''हीच तर प्रेमाची गंमत आहे

 Goshta tashi gamtishi - 'गोष्ट तशी गमतीची'Asa mi Assami - 'असा मी असामी'''

Personal life
Kadam is a very well balanced person in professional life. He is married to Marathi Play actress Leena Bhagwat.

Accolades
 Zee Natya Gaurav Award 2015 
 Akhil Bhartiy Natya Parishad - Special prize

References

Living people
Indian theatre directors
Indian male stage actors
Male actors from Mumbai
Indian television directors
Male actors in Marathi theatre
Year of birth missing (living people)